The 102nd Independent Brigade of the Territorial Defense Forces is a military formation of the Territorial Defense Forces of Ukraine in Ivano-Frankivsk Oblast. It is part of Operational Command West. The full name of the Brigade is the 102nd Independent Brigade of the Territorial Defense Forces named after Dmytro Vitovsky.

History

Formation 
In 2018 in Ivano-Frankivsk region Brigade was formed. On 30 January 2019 Brigade began to increase its ranks and units full Brigade level.

Between 27 May and 2 June 2019 150 reservist trained together in Kalush.

Russo-Ukrainian War

2022 Russian invasion of Ukraine
Engineering units of the Brigade were used to clear deoccupied areas from unexploded ordnance in July. On 11 August units of the Brigade destroyed and enemy BMP. Brigade also took part in Second Battle of Lyman in September.
Units of the Brigade took part in Southern Ukraine campaign, being deployed to Zaporizhzhia Oblast in September 2022. On 17 November soldiers destroyed a BTR-82AT. In January 2023 units of the brigade were training in Zaporizhzhia area. Medics of the 78th Territorial Defense Battalion were serving in Huliaipole during February 2023.

Structure 
As of 2022 the brigade's structure is as follows:
 Headquarters
 74th Territorial Defense Battalion (Yabluniv)
 75th Territorial Defense Battalion (Lysets)
 76th Territorial Defense Battalion (Nadvirna) А7135
 77th Territorial Defense Battalion (Hvizdets)
 78th Territorial Defense Battalion (Ivano-Frankivsk) А7154
 79th Territorial Defense Battalion (Kalush) А7166
 201st Territorial Defense Battalion (Verkhovyna)
 Counter-Sabotage Company
 Engineering Company
 Communication Company
 Logistics Company
 Mortar Battery

Commanders 
 Colonel Kopadze Yurii August 2021 - October 2022
 Colonel Lohvinenko Volodymyr October 2022 - present

See also 
 Territorial Defense Forces of the Armed Forces of Ukraine

References 

Territorial defense Brigades of Ukraine
2018 establishments in Ukraine
Military units and formations established in 2018